Lomatium gormanii, with the common names Gorman's biscuitroot and salt & pepper, is a perennial herb of the family Apiaceae.
It is endemic to the Northwestern United States, in Idaho, Oregon, and Washington, being found in steppes and montane environments. It is called sasamít̓a, sasamít̓aya, and łałamít̓a in the Sahaptin language.

The species flowers before many in the sagebrush steppe, when the ground is still covered in snow. Its condimental common name refers to the darkness of the violet anthers and the white petals. The leaves are divided and narrow.

Lomatium gormanii is easily confused with Lomatium piperi (Sahaptin mámɨn), but the roots are generally larger and 'hairier' (i.e., many more rootlets) than L. piperi, and it appears to grow where that species does not.

References

External links
  USDA Plants Profile for Lomatium gormanii (Gorman's biscuitroot)

gormanii
Flora of Idaho
Flora of Oregon
Flora of Washington (state)
Endemic flora of the United States
Taxa named by John Merle Coulter
Taxa named by John Thomas Howell
Flora without expected TNC conservation status